Ron Carpenter may refer to:

 Ron Carpenter (defensive back) (born 1970), former American football defensive back
 Ron Carpenter (defensive lineman) (born 1948), former American football defensive tackle
 Ron Carpenter (designer) (born 1950), British typographer